Pavel Pinto Vieira (born 15 February 1992) is a Bissau-Guinean footballer who plays for Cymru Premier 
side Cefn Druids.

After making is appearance in the Primeira Liga for Olhanense in May 2011, he spent the rest of his career in the lower leagues of Portugal, England, Italy and Wales. He earned one international cap for Guinea-Bissau in August 2011

Career
Born in Guinea-Bissau, Vieira spent his youth career in Portugal, with Mem Martins F.C., G.D. Estoril Praia, S.C. Farense and S.C. Olhanense. He made his professional debut in his only game for the last of those teams, on 14 May 2011 in the last game of the Primeira Liga season, coming on as a last-minute substitute for Jean Paul Yontcha in a 2–2 home draw with Rio Ave FC. On 10 August 2011 he made his only appearance for the Guinea-Bissau national team, a 4–1 friendly win over Equatorial Guinea at the Estádio do Restelo in Lisbon.

Vieira subsequently played in the third and fourth tiers of Portuguese football for several clubs. He also played at a similar level for Prescot Cables in England, Cultural y Deportiva Leonesa in Spain and AS Roccella in Italy. In August 2015 he played three games for Nelson – two in the league and a cup match.

On 31 August 2016, the last day of the transfer window, Vieira joined Bangor City in the Welsh Premier League. The following July, he dropped one level on the Welsh football league system to Airbus UK Broughton of the Cymru Alliance.

Vieira returned to Bangor in May 2019, with the club now in the second-tier Cymru North. On 27 September, he was one of three players sent off in a 7–0 loss at Prestatyn Town. On 8 January 2020, Viera joined Cymru Premier side Aberystwyth Town.

Personal life
On 30 March 2018, Vieira took a video recording of himself being racially abused on a bus in Kirkdale, Liverpool. The following month, 52-year-old Kevin Brophy pleaded guilty to a racially aggravated public order offence, having already a 2015 conviction for the same crime. He was given an eight-week prison sentence suspended for a year, and fined £115 victim surcharge, £100 in compensation to Vieira and £85 in court costs.

References

External links

1992 births
Living people
Bissau-Guinean footballers
Guinea-Bissau international footballers
Bissau-Guinean expatriate footballers
Bissau-Guinean expatriate sportspeople in Portugal
Bissau-Guinean expatriate sportspeople in England
Bissau-Guinean expatriate sportspeople in Italy
Bissau-Guinean expatriate sportspeople in Wales
Expatriate footballers in Portugal
Expatriate footballers in England
Expatriate footballers in Italy
Expatriate footballers in Wales
Association football midfielders
Primeira Liga players
Segunda Divisão players
S.C. Olhanense players
Bangor City F.C. players
Nelson F.C. players
Prescot Cables F.C. players
Airbus UK Broughton F.C. players
Cymru Premier players
Cymru Alliance players
Aberystwyth Town F.C. players
Prestatyn Town F.C. players
Cefn Druids A.F.C. players